Stella is a British comedy-drama series created and written by David Peet and Ruth Jones, who played the lead role. Stella was one of the flagship television comedy series that had been commissioned and aired on Sky One from 2012 to 2017. A total of 58 episodes aired over the course of six series, including two Christmas specials in 2014 and 2016 respectively. The sixth and final series began on 13 September 2017. In their media pack, Sky One confirmed this would be the last series of the show.

Series overview

Episodes

Series 1 (2012)

Series 2 (2013)

Series 3 (2014)

Christmas Special (2014)

Series 4 (2015)

Series 5 (2016)

Christmas Special (2016)

Series 6 (2017)

Notes

References

External links
 List of 

Lists of British comedy-drama television series episodes